A B unit, in railroad terminology, is a locomotive unit (generally a diesel locomotive) which does not have a control cab or crew compartment, and must therefore be operated in tandem with another coupled locomotive with a cab (an A unit). The terms booster unit and cabless are also used. The concept is largely confined to North America. Elsewhere, locomotives without driving cabs are rare.

Controls
Some B units cannot be moved without a controlling unit attached, but most have some simple controls inside, and often a side window at that control station. For example, B unit versions of the EMD FT with conventional couplers had a fifth porthole-style window added on the right side only for the control station. Other models used existing windows. These controls enable a hostler to move the B unit locomotive by itself in a yard or shops.  B units without controls are generally semi-permanently coupled to controlling units. Sometimes, there is a terminology distinction between the types: a 'booster' is a B unit with hostler controls, and a 'slave' is a B unit without hostler controls.

Reasons for use
The reasons railroads ordered B units included the fact that a B unit was slightly cheaper. With no driving cab, B units lack windshields, crew seats, radios, heating, and air conditioning. There would also be no toilets, which were usually found in the short hood of an A unit. Additionally, at first, railroads bought multiple-unit diesel locomotives as one-for-one replacements for steam locomotives; as a result, railroads could not take advantage of the flexibility afforded by interchangeable units, which could be assembled into any required power output. When a three- or four-unit locomotive was considered an indivisible unit, there was no point in the intermediate units having cabs. A further advantage was that as B units had no controls, unions were unable to insist that each unit be staffed. Finally, B units gave a smoother, streamlined appearance to the train for passenger service.

The B unit era
B units were commonly built in the cab unit days in the 1930s, 1940s, 1950s and 1960s. When hood unit road switchers became the common kind of diesel locomotive, some B units were built, but many railroads soon came to the opinion that the lower cost of a B unit did not offset the lack of operational flexibility.  Few B units have been built in the last 40 years.  Railroads that kept ordering B units longer than most were largely Western roads, including the Southern Pacific, Union Pacific, Burlington Northern, and the Santa Fe. Santa Fe ordered the GP60B model in 1991, which were the final B units built for road service in North America as of 2005.

Conversions
In some cases, a B unit is converted from an already existing A unit. The cab is either removed or has its windows blanked out (such as on CSX GE BQ23-7 units), and all non-essential equipment is removed. The degree to which this equipment is removed depends on the railroad, but may (and usually does) include the removal of the speedometer, event recorder, horn, headlights, toilet, and cab heaters. This conversion was sometimes performed when the A unit had been in a collision and rebuilding the cab was not cost-effective. In some rare instances, B units were converted to incorporate a cab, such as on the Chicago & North Western Railway in the 1970s with some EMD E8 B units bought from the Union Pacific. The homebuilt cabs were referred to as "Crandall Cabs". Also, the Santa Fe rebuilt four of its five GP7Bs to GP9us with cabs. In the Illinois Central Gulf's GP11 rebuild program, some of the engines used were ex-UP GP9Bs, and in their SD20 program, some ex-UP SD24Bs were also used. BNSF converted a former ATSF GP60B #370 into a cab unit and was renumbered to #170 in 2010.

Unusual consists
In rare instances, a B unit will run at the front of a train. That is usually avoided because it limits visibility from the locomotive cab, but locomotive orientation and operational requirements may dictate that the B–unit runs first. A prominent example is the Haysi Railroad, which owned an F7B that was given radio controls and a makeshift cab.

List of B unit locomotive models 

These are all known B unit models, with discrepancies settled by the later (Marre) reference. At least one of each model was manufactured. All units below contain one or more engines and traction motors, so slugs and snails are not listed.  Cow-calf units are also not listed, since these were considered a single locomotive. The New York City Revenue cars 66 and 67 were R8A units which were B units also.

United States
Factory-built:
 ALCO/MLW - Black Maria Booster, DL-108, DL-110, FB-1, FB-2, FPB-2, FPB-4, PB-1, PB-2, C855B, M420B
 Baldwin - AS-616B, DRS-6-6-1500B, DR-4-4-15B, RF-16B, DR-6-4-15B, DR-6-4-20B
 EMD E units - EB, E1B, E2B, E3B, E4B, E5B, E6B, E7B, E8B, E9B
 EMD F-units - FTB, F2B, F3B, F7B, F9B 
 EMD Hood units – DD35, GP7B, GP9B, GP30B, GP60B, SD24B
 Fairbanks-Morse - B Erie, CFB-16-4, CFB-20-4, CPB-16-4, CPB-16-5
 GE Transportation Systems - UM20B booster, B30-7A

Rebuilds:
 EMD Hood units - GP38-2B (by BN), SD40B (by BN), SD40-2B (by BN), SD45B (by ATSF), SD45-2B (by ATSF)
 GE Transportation Systems - U30CB (by BN; MP also operated a cabless U30C but did not give it this designation), B36-7 (B) (by SSW)

Russia
TE10 locomotives have A-B-A or A-B-B-A unit configurations, which called 3TE10M, and 4TE10S respectively. B–unit of 3TE10 have reduced set of driving controls, intended for service movement of the locomotive. The last 3-unit TE10 rebuild called 3TE10MK, equipped with computer-aided cab controls. Newer  family is similar. Most of these locomotives work on BAM rail line, located on Russian Far East.

Australia
4 Australian National BUs, rebuilt from South Australian Railways 600 class by Morrison-Knudsen, Whyalla in 1994
3 CM40-8ML - cabless version of C40-8 built on C636 frames for BHP in 1994
3 Pacific National XRB class built in 2005/06

Italy
 Class E.322 and Class E.324 electric locomotives (without cab and also pantograph).

France
 Class TBB 64800

References 

 Marre, Louis A. (1995). Diesel Locomotives: The First 50 Years. Kalmbach Publishing Co. .
 Pinkepank, Jerry A. (1973). The Second Diesel Spotter's Guide. Kalmbach Books. Library of Congress Catalog Card No. 66-22894.

Diesel locomotives